Where Are Our Children Going? is a 1958 Mexican drama film directed by Benito Alazraki. It was released in 1958. It starred Dolores del Río. Based in the play Half Tone (Medio tono) by Rodolfo Usigli.

Plot
Martin (Tito Junco) is a bureaucrat who lives with his wife Rosa (Dolores del Río) and their children Julio, Gabriela, Sara, Victor and little Martin. When each of their children begins to face problems of life, Martin and Rosa reach a point in their long relationship in which indecision and clashes seem to become daily bread, and their marriage will be in danger ... together with the family unit of their children.

Cast
 Dolores del Río - as Rosa
 Tito Junco - as Martin
 Ana Bertha Lepe - as Gabriela
 Martha Mijares - as Sara
 Carlos Fernández - as Julio
 León Michel - as Victor
 Rogelio Jiménez-Pons - as Martin Jr.
 Andrea Palma - as Carlos mother

References

External links

 Where Are Our Children Going? on FilmAffinity

1958 films
1950s Spanish-language films
1958 drama films
Films directed by Benito Alazraki
Mexican drama films
1950s Mexican films